Pottstown Roller Mill is a historic roller mill located on the Schuylkill River at Pottstown, Montgomery County, Pennsylvania.  The original mill building was built in 1725.  It was constructed of fieldstone, two stories tall, and three bays wide and two bays deep. The building was altered in 1849.  In 1856, two brick stories were added to the original fieldstone mill.  A five-bay, brick addition was subsequently added and doubled the size of the 1856 mill.  The property includes the contributing dam and mill race.

It was added to the National Register of Historic Places in 1974.

The mill provided flour to George Washington's Continental Army during the Revolutionary War.

It is "the roller mill of Jesse Ives ... that provided shelter for escaping slaves" in the Underground Railroad.

The Mill faced extensive flooding due to Hurricane Agnes in 1972 but served the community continuously despite major damages. As of this time, the Mill no longer sold flour, but "a post Revolutionary War era water wheel turned by a race stream siphoned from the Manatawny still provide[d] most of the power to operate the mill."

The Pottstown Roller Mills, Inc. survives today at 625 Industrial Highway, less than a mile from the original historic building.

References

Grinding mills on the National Register of Historic Places in Pennsylvania
Industrial buildings completed in 1725
Buildings and structures in Montgomery County, Pennsylvania
Grinding mills in Pennsylvania
National Register of Historic Places in Montgomery County, Pennsylvania